Robert Green (born 1980) is an English footballer.

Robert, Rob, Robbie or Bob Green may also refer to:

Politicians
 Robert A. Green (1892–1973), U.S. Representative from Florida
 Robert Francis Green (1861–1946), Canadian businessman and Member of Parliament
 Robert Stockton Green (1831–1890), 27th Governor of New Jersey and member of the U.S. House of Representative

Sports
 Robert Green (American football) (born 1970), American football player
 Robert Green (cricketer) (1894–1969), English cricketer
 Robbie Green (born 1974), English darts player
 Bob Green (footballer) (1911–1949), Australian rules footballer

Others
 Rob Green (film director), film director
 Robert C. Green (born 1954), American physician and geneticist
 Robert L. Green (died 1997), fashion director for Playboy magazine
 Robert M. Green (1935–2003), American architect
 Spice 1 (born 1970), rapper born Robert L. Green, Jr.
 Bob Green (naturalist) (1925–2013), Australian naturalist and museum curator
 Robert "Two Eagles" Green, chief emeritus of the Patawomeck Indian tribe
 Robert Green, who re-created the Doves Type in 2013

See also
 Bob Green (disambiguation)
 Bobby Green (disambiguation)
 Bert Green (disambiguation)
 Robert Greene (disambiguation)
 Robert-Jay Green, American psychologist
 Robert Green Ingersoll (1833–1899), American political leader and orator
 Robert Green Brooks (born 1957), American record producer
 Anita Bryant (born 1940), former spouse of Miami DJ Bob Green